Anak ni Waray vs. Anak ni Biday (International title: Hidden Lies / ) is a Philippine television drama series broadcast by GMA Network. The series is based on a 1984 Philippine film of the same title. Directed by Mark Sicat dela Cruz, it stars Barbie Forteza and Kate Valdez. It premiered on January 27, 2020 on the network's Telebabad line up replacing Beautiful Justice. The series concluded on March 12, 2021, with a total of 62 episodes. It was replaced by First Yaya in its timeslot.

The series is streaming online on YouTube.

Cast and characters

Lead cast
 Barbie Forteza as Ginalyn Agpangan Escoto
 Kate Valdez as Caitlyn Malatamban Escoto

Supporting cast
 Snooky Serna as Amelia "Amy" Malatamban
 Dina Bonnevie as Susanna "Sussie" Agpangan
 Migo Adecer as Francisco "Cocoy" Tolentino 
 Jay Manalo as Joaquin Escoto
 Jean Saburit as Vanessa Tolentino
 Teresa Loyzaga as Dorcas Escoto-Ñedo
 Faith Da Silva as Agatha Escoto Ñedo
 Tanya Montenegro as Glenda Odon
 Benedict Cua as Benedict "Benny" Vargas

Guest cast
 Lovi Poe as young Sussie
 Max Collins as young Amy
 Jason Abalos as young Joaquin
 Pinky Amador as young Zenaida
 Yana Asistio as young Glenda
 Franco Gray Nerona as Joni
 Elle Ramirez as young Leng
 Karenina Haniel as Beverly
 Ashley Ortega as Alison
 Cai Cortez as Ezra
 Mark Malana as Tony
 Ralph Noriega as Lander
 Jay Arcilla as Luis
 Shermaine Santiago as Lucy
 Celia Rodriguez as Zenaida
 Gladys Guevarra as Leng

Production
Principal photography was halted in March 2020 due to the enhanced community quarantine in Luzon caused by the COVID-19 pandemic. Filming was continued in September 2020. The series resumed its programming on February 8, 2021.

Ratings
According to AGB Nielsen Philippines' Nationwide Urban Television Audience Measurement People in television homes, the final episode of Anak ni Waray vs. Anak ni Biday scored a 19.6% rating.

Episodes

References

External links
 
 

2020 Philippine television series debuts
2021 Philippine television series endings
Filipino-language television shows
GMA Network drama series
Live action television shows based on films
Television productions suspended due to the COVID-19 pandemic
Television shows set in the Philippines